The County of Lennox is a county (a cadastral division) in Queensland, Australia.  Like all counties in Queensland, it is a non-functional administrative unit, that is used mainly for the purpose of registering land titles.

The county consists of the inland region forming the western parts of the Gympie and Fraser Coast regions. It was officially named and bounded by the Governor in Council on 7 March 1901 under the Land Act 1897.

Parishes 
Lennox is divided into parishes, as listed below:

References

Lennox

External links